is a Japanese football player.

Career
Junya Ito joined FC Tokyo in 2016. On July 3, he debuted in the J3 League, playing against Fukushima United FC.

References

External links

1998 births
Living people
Association football people from Tokyo
Japanese footballers
J1 League players
J3 League players
FC Tokyo players
FC Tokyo U-23 players
Association football midfielders